In agriculture and horticulture, a seed treatment is any additional material added to the seed. By the amount of material added, it can be divided into:

 A seed dressing, typically containing a "protectant" (pesticide) applied to the seed and possibly some color.
 A seed coating, a layer of thin film applied to the seed typically less than 10% of the mass of the original seed.
 Seed encrusting, where the applied material is typically 100%–500% of the original seed mass, but the shape is still discernible.
 Seed pelleting, where the applied material is so thick that the seed's original shape is not discernible.

Seed treatment provides the following functions:

 For formulations with pesticides, direct application to seeds can be environmentally more friendly, as the amounts used can be very small.
 Color makes treated seed less attractive to birds, and easier to see and clean up in the case of an accidental spillage.
 A thick coating can improve handling, by hand or by machine. Thinner coatings may also help with characteristics like flowability.
 Thick coatings may accommodate additional features such as fertilizers, plant hormones, plant-beneficial microbes, and water-retaining polymers.

Specialist machinery is required to safely and efficiently apply the chemical to the seed. A cement mixer is enough for non-hazardous coating materials. The term "seed dressing" is also used to refer to the process of removing chaff, weed seeds and straw from a seed stock.

History 
The earliest seed dressings were of organo-mercurials used to control pests such as oat smut and bunt of wheat. These were available from the 1930s but were ineffective on Pythium and Fusarium species which are pathogens of many crops including cotton, maize and soya. Thiram was therefore developed as a seed treatment in the 1940s to extend the spectrum of diseases that could be controlled.
In 1949 ICI commercialised a seed treatment with trade name Mergamma A, containing 1% mercury and 20% lindane, an early example of a product designed to protect the seed from both fungal and insect attack.

Biocide 
One seed pesticide, imidacloprid, from the neonicotinoid family of insecticides, is controversial and was banned in France for use on maize, due to that government's belief that the chemical was implicated in recent dramatic drops in bee counts, and possibly in Colony Collapse Disorder. Dust from treated seed is known to have caused at least some health and safety problems particularly from crops such as maize drilled during the main honey flows. Improvements to pneumatic drills to reduce dust release, and improvements to seed treatment compounds to prevent the compound breaking up into dust (dust-off) have been introduced in Europe led by Germany and the Netherlands from 2009 to 2012. Information on seed treatments including the information above can be seen on the registration authority databases.

In order to qualify for the United States Department of Agriculture Organic certification, farmers must seek out organic seed. If they cannot find organic seed, they are allowed to use conventional, untreated seed. Seed treated with pesticide however, is never allowed.

Water-retainer 
Water-absorbing polymers may be added around seeds to help with absorbing water dry conditions, or to delay the germination until drought has passed. It has seen some use in the industry.

Fertilizer 
Seed coating may contain a dose of fertilizer, typically of plant micronutrients, but also occasionally containing slow-release macronutrients.

Inoculum 
A sufficiently-thick seed coating can allow for seeds to be distributed pre-inoculated with symbiotic microbes such as rhizobia for legumes. The formulation of the coating slurry plays a huge role in maintaining the viability of these microbes. The state-of-the-art academic formulation (as of 2019) is able to maintain microbial populations for 9 months, quite a bit behind the viability of the seeds themselves. Despite these drawbacks, inocula have been used in commercially coated seeds, with much obscurity as to whether and how they maintain viability.

See also 
 Seed ball, pelleting of many seeds

References

Agricultural chemicals
Horticultural techniques